Simon Anthony Lee Brett OBE FRSL (born 28 October 1945 in Worcester Park, Surrey, England) is a British author of detective fiction, a playwright, and a producer-writer for television and radio. As an author, he is best known for his mystery series featuring Charles Paris, Mrs Pargeter, Fethering and Blotto & Twinks. His radio credits have included The Hitchhiker's Guide to the Galaxy, I'm Sorry I Haven't a Clue and Just a Minute.

Personal life
The son of chartered surveyor John Brett and Margaret (née Lee), a teacher, he was educated at Dulwich College and Wadham College, Oxford, where he gained a first-class honours degree in English. He is married with three children and lives in Arundel, West Sussex, England.

Brett was the president of the Detection Club from 2000 to 2015. He was appointed Officer of the Order of the British Empire (OBE) in the 2016 New Year Honours for services to literature.

Radio and television career
After his graduation from Oxford University, Brett joined the BBC as a trainee and worked for BBC Radio and London Weekend Television. While with the BBC, Brett produced the pilot episode of The Hitchhiker's Guide to the Galaxy, as well as many episodes of the comedy series The Burkiss Way, as well as the comedy panel games I'm Sorry I Haven't a Clue and Just a Minute and radio adaptations of Lord Peter Wimsey. He also co-produced  From Us To You for BBC Radio 4 with David Hatch. In the mid-1990s, Brett wrote and hosted Foul Play, a radio panel game in which well-known writers of detective fiction were challenged to solve a dramatised mystery. When he moved into television, Brett was responsible for producing End of Part One (1979–80) and the television revival of The Glums (1979), both for LWT.

Brett wrote several sitcoms, including BBC Radio 4's After Henry, No Commitments, Semi Circles and Smelling of Roses. After Henry was later produced on television for ITV.  He has written episodes of the BBC radio detective drama Baldi (2000).

In 1987, the Nigel Molesworth character created by Geoffrey Willans was reprised for a four-part BBC Radio 4 series Molesworth. Written by Simon Brett, the series portrayed Molesworth in middle age, still surrounded by many of the characters from his youth. Molesworth was played by Willie Rushton, with Penelope Nice as his wife Louise, and Clive Swift as the now aged ex-headmaster Grimes.

Bibliography

Detective novels 
Brett has written four series of detective novels (Charles Paris, Mrs Pargeter, Fethering, and Blotto & Twinks). Most of these novels are in the "Golden Age" tradition of detective fiction, entertaining the reader through humour, eccentric characters and intricate plot twists. He has also written several mystery plays and some non-series novels, of which A Shock to the System (1984) is probably best known because the filmed version starred Michael Caine as the business executive who takes revenge after being passed over for promotion. 
In 2014, Brett was chosen as the recipient of the Cartier Diamond Dagger from the Crime Writers' Association for "an outstanding body of work in crime fiction".

Charles Paris
To date Brett has written 20 books about Charles Paris, an unhappily separated (but not divorced, more than 30 years on), moderately successful character actor with a slight drinking problem who gets entangled in various crimes, and finds himself unwillingly in the role of amateur detective.

Cast, In Order of Disappearance (1975)
So Much Blood (1976)
Star Trap (1977)
An Amateur Corpse (1978)
A Comedian Dies (1979)
The Dead Side of the Mic (1980)
Situation Tragedy (1981)
Murder Unprompted (1982)
Murder in the Title (1983)
Not Dead, Only Resting (1984) 
Dead Giveaway (1985)
What Bloody Man Is That? (1987)
A Series of Murders (1989)
Corporate Bodies (1991)
A Reconstructed Corpse (1993)
Sicken and So Die (1995)
Dead Room Farce (1998)
A Decent Interval (2013)
The Cinderella Killer (2014)
A Deadly Habit (2018)

Cast, In Order of Disappearance and So Much Blood were both adapted as serials for BBC Radio 2 with Francis Matthews in the lead role in the 1980s.

Bill Nighy has played Paris in a series of BBC Radio productions. The first, an adaptation of So Much Blood for The Saturday Play in 1999, was recorded on location at its Edinburgh Fringe setting. A Series of Murders followed as another Saturday Play in 2004, leading into a number of half-hour serials which began with Sicken and So Die (2006) and continued with Murder Unprompted (2007) and The Dead Side of the Mike (2008), with So Much Blood apparently happening between the last two serials. These serials have all been updated from the novels, and adapted to deal with continuity problems caused by the adaptations being made out of order in relation to the books, with later adaptations featuring more far-reaching changes to the central mysteries.

Cast, In Order of Disappearance, this time starring Francis Matthews as Paris, began airing on Friday 29 January 2010 on BBC Radio 4. From 26 February, its slot was taken for three weeks by an original series from Brett. A three-hour I Did It My Way programme featuring Brett's work was rebroadcast by BBC Radio 7 on Saturday 20 February 2010, including a repeat of A Series of Murders.

This was followed by Murder in the Title (2010) which aired weekly from 22 November to 13 December 2010. Nighy returned to the role in A Reconstructed Corpse (2012). Other recurring cast members include Jon Glover as Charles's agent Maurice, and Suzanne Burden as his estranged wife Frances. On 5 December 2012 a 4-part adaptation of An Amateur Corpse began on Radio 4; Nighy and Burden again played Charles and Frances. A tenth story starring Bill Nighy as Charles began broadcast on 25 June 2014; this 4-part adaptation of Corporate Bodies also stars Suzanne Burden as Frances.

List of radio adaptations with Bill Nighy as Charles:

Saturday plays
 So Much Blood (recorded on location at Edinburgh Fringe), 1999
 A Series of Murders, 2004

Half-hour 4-part serials 
 Sicken and So Die, 2006
 Murder Unprompted, 2007
 The Dead Side of the Mic (So Much Blood set between last 2 serials), 2008
 Cast in Order of Disappearance, began 29 January 2010
 Murder in the Title, began 22 November 2010
 A Reconstructed Corpse, 2012
 An Amateur Corpse, began 5 December 2012
 Corporate Bodies, began 25 June 2014
 A Decent Interval, 9–30 March 2016
 The Cinderella Killer, began 2 December 2016
 Dead Room Farce, 23 February to 16 March 2018
 Star Trap, 6 March 2019
 A Doubtful Death, 22 May to 12 June 2020
 A Deadly Habit, 3 to 24 September 2021

Mrs Pargeter
Mrs Pargeter is a widow with a shadowy past who, with a little help from her dead husband's friends, is able to solve uncanny mysteries. The Mrs Pargeter novels include:

A Nice Class of Corpse (1986)
Mrs, Presumed Dead (1988)
Mrs Pargeter's Package (1990)
Mrs Pargeter's Pound of Flesh (1992)
Mrs Pargeter's Plot (1996)
Mrs Pargeter's Point of Honour (1999)
Mrs Pargeter's Principle (2015)
Mrs Pargeter's Public Relations (2017)

Fethering
Fethering is a fictitious village on England's south coast (adjacent to Tarring). It is the place of residence of amateur sleuths Carole Seddon, a retired civil servant, and her neighbour, Jude Nichol, whose origins are obscure. Twenty-one Fethering mysteries have been published so far:

The Body on the Beach (2000)
Death on the Downs (2001)
The Torso in the Town (2002)
Murder in the Museum (2003)
The Hanging in the Hotel (2004)
The Witness at the Wedding (2005)
The Stabbing in the Stables (2006)
Death Under the Dryer (2007)
Blood at the Bookies (2008)
The Poisoning at the Pub (2009)
The Shooting in the Shop (2010)
Bones Under the Beach Hut (2011)
Guns in the Gallery (2011)
Corpse on the Court (2012)
The Strangling on the Stage (2013)
The Tomb in Turkey (2014)
The Killing in the Cafe (2015)
The Liar in the Library (2017)
The Killer in the Choir (2019)
Guilt at the Garage (2020)
Death and the Decorator (2022)
Since 2011, Brett's Fethering series has been published by Severn House.

Blotto and Twinks
Farcical whodunnits set just after the First World War and featuring the handsome and dim "Blotto" and his beautiful and clever sister "Twinks", both from a ducal family.
Blotto, Twinks and the Ex-King's Daughter (2009)
Blotto, Twinks and the Dead Dowager Duchess (2010)
Blotto, Twinks and the Rodents of the Riviera (2011)
Blotto, Twinks and the Bootlegger's Moll (2012)
Blotto, Twinks and the Riddle of the Sphinx (July 2013)
Blotto, Twinks and the Heir to the Tsar (July 2015)
Blotto, Twinks and the Stars of the Silver Screen (2017)
Blotto, Twinks and the Intimate Revue (2018)
Blotto, Twinks and the Great Road Race (2019)
Blotto, Twinks and the Maharajah's Jewel (2021)

Decluttering Mystery
Features Ellen Curtis, a widow with two grown children whose decluttering business brings her into contact with murder.
The Clutter Corpse (2020)
An Untidy Death (2021)
Waste of a Life (2022)

Plays
Murder in Play (1994)
Mr Quigley's Revenge (1995)
Silhouette (1998)
The Tale of Little Red Riding Hood (1998)
Sleeping Beauty (1999)
Putting the Kettle on (2002)
A Bad Dream (2005)
Quirks (2009)
A Healthy Grave (2010)
Murder with Ghosts (2015)

Anthologies
The Faber book of Useful Verse (1981)
Take a Spare Truss (1983)
The Faber book of Parodies (1984)
The Faber book of Diaries (1987)
The Detection Collection (2005)

Frank Muir Goes into
Each book is a compilation of the anecdotes taken from the BBC Radio 4 series 'Frank Muir Goes into', which was produced by Brett and presented by Frank Muir and Alfred Marks.
Frank Muir Goes into... (1978)
The Second Frank Muir Goes into... (1979)
The Third Frank Muir Goes into... (1980)
Frank Muir on Children (1980)
The Fourth Frank Muir Goes into... (1981)
Frank Muir presents the Book of Comedy Sketches (1982)

How to Be a Little Sod

How to Be a Little Sod (1992)
Look Who's Walking: Further Diaries of a Little Sod (1994)
Not Another Little Sod! (1997)

Other
The Child-Owner's Handbook (1983)
Molesworth Rites Again (1983)
A Shock to the System (1984)
Bad Form (1984)
Dead Romantic (1985)
People-Spotting (1985)
The Three Detectives and the Missing Superstar (1986)
The Wastepaper Basket Archive (1986)
How to Stay Topp (1987)
After Henry (1987)
The Three Detectives and the Knight in Armour (1987)
The Booker Book (1989)
The Christmas Crimes at Puzzel Manor (1991)
Look Who's Walking (1994)
Singled Out (1995)
Baby Tips for Dads (2005)
Baby Tips for Mums (2005)
The Penultimate Chance Saloon (2006)

References

External links
 
  Samuel French – London, publishers of plays

1945 births
Fellows of the Royal Society of Literature
Living people
BBC radio producers
English crime fiction writers
English dramatists and playwrights
20th-century English novelists
21st-century English novelists
English radio producers
English radio writers
People from Arundel
People from Worcester Park
Members of the Detection Club
Alumni of Wadham College, Oxford
People educated at Dulwich College
English male dramatists and playwrights
English male novelists
Officers of the Order of the British Empire
20th-century English male writers
21st-century English male writers
Cartier Diamond Dagger winners